The Gran Duo Concertante for two double basses and orchestra was composed by the Italian double bass virtuoso Giovanni Bottesini in 1880.  The piece was premiered by Bottesini and Luigi Negri, a former classmate of the composer. Negri was a student of Luigi Rossi at the Milan Conservatory at the same time as his more well-known colleague.

The Gran Duo Concertante is a single, sprawling movement and usually lasts around 15 minutes if played up to tempo, but this estimate can vary greatly due to the artists' interpretation of the music. While double concertos were generally composed for different instruments, Bottesini did not seem to consider the questionable practicality of a piece that requires two very talented double bassists. Camillo Sivori, the disciple of Niccolò Paganini, transcribed one of the bass parts for violin soon after its premiere. Sivori's version is that most commonly heard today, although his contribution is rarely acknowledged and even most bassists are unaware of the piece's original instrumentation.

Bottesini also wrote another concerto for two double basses entitled "Gran Duo Passione Amorosa" in a more traditional, three-movement format.

Bottesini
1880 compositions
Compositions for double bass
Compositions by Giovanni Bottesini